The 2010 season was Seongnam Ilhwa Chunma's twenty-second season in the K-League in South Korea. Seongnam Ilhwa Chunma is competing in K-League, League Cup, Korean FA Cup and Champions League as previous season's runner-up.

Current squad

K-League

Championship

Korean FA Cup

League Cup

Group stage

Champions League

Group stage

Knockout stage

Club World Cup

Squad statistics

Appearances and goals
Statistics accurate as of match played 18 December 2010

Top scorers

Discipline

Transfer

In
  Jang Suk-Won (Dankook Univ.) — 2008 Draft Preferred Nomination (Pungsaeng HS)
  Hong Chul (Dankook Univ.) — 2009 Draft Preferred Nomination (Pungsaeng HS)
  Yoon Young-Sun (Dankook Univ.) — 2010 Draft Round 1
  Jo Jae-Cheol (Ajou Univ.) — 2010 Draft Round 2
  Jeong Ho-Jeong (Kwangwoon Univ.) — 2010 Draft Round 4
  Park Sang-Hee (Sangji Univ.) — 2010 Draft Round 5
  Yong Hyun-Jin (Konkuk Univ.) — 2010 Draft Round 6
  Kim Dong-Jin (Sangji Univ.) — 2010 Draft Supplement 1
  Park Sang-Hyeon (Korea Univ.) — 2010 Draft Supplement 2
  Lee Su-Jae (Yonsei Univ.) — 2010 Draft Supplement 3
  Min Byeong-Jun (Kyonggi Univ.) — 2010 Draft Supplement 4
  Lee Sang-Ki (Sungkyunkwan Univ.) — 2010 Draft Supplement 5
  Lee Sun-Suk (Yeoido HS) — 2010 Draft Supplement 6
  Namkung Do (Pohang Steelers) — Transfer (4 January 2010)
  Song Ho-Young (Gyeongnam FC) — Transfer (11 January 2010)
  Kang Sung-Kwan (Sangji Univ.) — Scout
  Choi Sung-Kuk (Gwangju Sangmu) — Return because of military service end (30 October 2010)

Out
  Lee Ho (Al Ain Club) — Contract end (December 2009)
  Han Dong-Won (Montedio Yamagata) — Contract end (December 2009)
  Kim Jin-Hee — Release (December 2009)
  Park Kyuk-Po — Contract end (December 2009)
  Park Sung-Soo — Contract end (December 2009)
  Kim Kyung-Sub — Release (December 2009)
  Jeon Sang-Wook (Busan I'Park) — Contract end (December 2009)
  Lim Jae-Hoon — Release (December 2009)
  Ryu Hyung-Ryul (Cheonan City) — Contract end (December 2009)
  Kim Sung-Kyun (Gangwon FC) — Contract end (December 2009)
  Yoon Jae-Min — Contract end (December 2009)
  Lee Kyung-Min — Release (December 2009)
  Park Kwang-Min (Mokpo City) — Contract end (December 2009)
  Lee Won-Hee — Contract end (December 2009)
  Seo Seok-Won (Mokpo City) — Transfer (January 2010)
  Jin Min-Ho (Mokpo City) — Transfer (January 2010)
  Shin Dong-Keun (Goyang KB Kookmin Bank) — Transfer (January 2010)
  Kim Yong-Dae (FC Seoul) — Transfer (3 January 2010)
  Park Woo-Hyun (Busan I'Park) — Transfer (19 January 2010)
  Fabricio — Contract end (June 2010)
  Jang Hak-Young (Seoul United) — On loan because of military service for two years (23 July 2010)

Honours

Club
AFC Champions League Winners

Individual
K-League Best XI:  Saša,  Molina
AFC Champions League MVP:  Saša
FIFA Club World Cup Top Scorer:  Molina (3 goals)

References

 Seongnam Ilhwa Chunma website 

South Korean football clubs 2010 season
2010